The 2006 season was the fifteenth full year of competitive football in the Baltic country as an independent nation. The Estonia national football team played a total number of seven international matches in 2006 after not having qualified for the 2006 FIFA World Cup in Germany.

Northern Ireland vs Estonia

Turkey vs Estonia

Estonia vs New Zealand

Estonia vs FYR Macedonia

Estonia vs Israel

Russia vs Estonia

Estonia vs Belarus

Notes

References
RSSSF detailed results

2006
2006 national football team results
National